Rachlin is a surname. Notable people with the surname include:

Ann Rachlin (born 1933), British music educator
Ezra Rachlin (1915–1995), American conductor and pianist
Howard Rachlin (born 1935), American psychologist
Julian Rachlin (born 1974), Lithuanian violinist, violist and conductor
Natan Rachlin (1905–1979), Ukrainian conductor
Robert D. Rachlin, American lawyer

References